Carinya Christian School is a multi-campus independent Christian comprehensive co-educational early learning, primary, secondary day school located in the New England region of New South Wales, Australia. The school caters for approximately 600 students from early learning to Year 12. The School is aligned with the Reformed Church Westminster Confession of Faith.

Carinya Tamworth also offers a Gumnut class, a two-day program for three-year-olds. Students come from Gunnedah, Quirindi, Werris Creek, Manilla, Somerton, Narrabri and Carroll.

History 
Carinya Christian School Tamworth commenced in May 1984 with 6 students in Kindergarten to Year 3. It was founded by religious parents who wished to see their sons and daughters educated at a religious institution.

Sports 
Students represent the school in many sports including rugby union (from open primary to first XV), netball, soccer, touch football, rugby league sevens,  golf, swimming, hockey, athletics and show cattle. The rugby union teams compete in the LBK Prime Cup Friday night competition, while the netball and soccer teams play in Tamworth Saturday competitions.

Global Citizenship Program 
This program is run by the school aiming to give students a global perspective. Part of this program involves an exchange program with a school from Tonga. The program runs with every year students from Carinya being hosted by, or hosting students from Tonga. The program has been running since 2003.

No recognition of achievement 

Neither academic nor sporting achievement are recognised with awards. This based on the school's philosophy of "seeking the reward in the task".

See also 

List of non-government schools in New South Wales
Education in Australia

References

External links 
 School website

Buildings and structures in Tamworth, New South Wales
Private primary schools in New South Wales
Private secondary schools in New South Wales
Educational institutions established in 1984
Nondenominational Christian schools in New South Wales
1984 establishments in Australia